Anna University is a public state university located in Tamil Nadu, India. The main campus is in Chennai. It was originally established on 4 September 1978 and is named after C. N. Annadurai, the former Chief Minister of Tamil Nadu.

History and structure

Anna University (Chennai) comprises four colleges - The College of Engineering (CEG, Guindy Campus), The Alagappa College of Technology (ACT, Guindy Campus), The Madras Institute of Technology (MIT, Chromepet Campus) and The School of Architecture and Planning (SAP, Guindy Campus).

The first version of Anna University was formed in 1978 and various governments changed the varsity's structure and affiliation scope repeatedly. In 2001, under the Anna University Amendment Act of 2001, the erstwhile Anna University became an affiliating university, taking under its wings all the engineering colleges in Tamil Nadu. This included six government engineering colleges, three government-aided private institutions, and 426 self-financed colleges. On 1 February 2007, as a result of a Government of Tamil Nadu decision, the university was split into six constituent universities: Anna University, Chennai; Anna University of Technology, Chennai; Anna University of Technology, Tiruchirappalli; Anna University of Technology, Coimbatore; Anna University of Technology Tirunelveli and Anna University of Technology, Madurai. The institutes were formally created in 2010. On 14 September 2011, a bill was passed to re-merge the universities. The merger was finalized in August 2012.

In 2011 and 2012 the constituents were merged back to a single affiliating university and the four regional universities continue to function as a regional campus of the university.

Admissions
A common entrance test – the Tamil Nadu Professional Courses Entrance Examination (TNPCEE) – was used as a basis for admission to professional courses in the state until 2006. Starting in the academic year 2007–08, students were admitted to engineering colleges on the basis of their higher secondary marks. Post-graduate admission process is carried out through TANCET and GATE scores.

Academics
The university offers courses in engineering and technology through its affiliated colleges and follows a dual semester system. Every year the university conducts examinations for the even semester in May–June and for an odd semester in November–December.

Rankings 
	
Internationally, Anna University was ranked under 1000 in the QS World University Rankings & Times Higher Education World University Rankings in 2023

Affiliated colleges

The university's campus is in Chennai. The university has satellite campuses in Coimbatore, Tiruchirappalli, Madurai and Tirunelveli. The university also runs engineering colleges at Villupuram, Tindivanam, Arani and Kanchipuram in Chennai region, Erode and Bargur in Coimbatore region, Panruti, Pattukkottai, Thirukkuvalai and Ariyalur in Tiruchirapalli region, Ramanathapuram and Dindigul in Madurai region, Nagercoil and Thoothukudi in Tirunelveli region.

Notable alumni

 A Lalitha, first female engineer from India
 A. C. Muthiah, Indian industrialist and former Board of Control for Cricket in India president
 Nagarjuna, Telugu film actor
 Anumolu Ramakrishna, deputy managing director of Larsen & Toubro
 Crazy Mohan, Tamil comedy actor, script writer and playwright
Kavithalaya Krishnan  Indian film and television actor
 Dhiraj Rajaram, founder & chairman of Mu Sigma Inc
 Gopalaswami Parthasarathy, former Indian High Commissioner to Pakistan, Australia and Myanmar and Chancellor, Central University of Jammu
 Kanuri Lakshmana Rao, architect of India's water management, Former Union Minister of Irrigation & Power and recipient of the Padma Bhushan
 Krishnakumar Natarajan, co-founder & former executive chairman of Mindtree
 Krishnamachari Srikkanth, former Indian cricket captain and former chairman, National Selection Committee of the Indian Cricket Team
 Kutraleeswaran, long-distance swimmer and Guinness Book of World Records holder
 Madhan Karky, Tamil film lyricist
 Mendu Rammohan Rao, former dean emeritus, Indian School of Business
 Munirathna Anandakrishnan, former chairman, Indian Institute of Technology, Kanpur and former vice-chancellor, Anna University
 N. Mahalingam, founder & former chairman, Sakthi Group and former chairman, Ethiraj College for Women
 P. S. Veeraraghavan, director of Vikram Sarabhai Space Centre
 R. K. Baliga, developer of the Electronics City in Bangalore, India
 P. V. Nandhidhaa, Indian chess player, India's 17th Woman Grandmaster. 
Ponnambalam "Poondi" Kumaraswamy, engineer, mathematician, and hydrologist
 Raj Reddy, Turing Award winner, professor at Carnegie-Mellon University and Padma Bhushan recipient 
 Rajkumar Bharathi, classical singer and music composer
 Rangaswamy Narasimhan, cognitive scientist who developed TIFRAC, the first indigenous Indian computer, Padma Shri winner
 Ravi Ruia, vice chairperson & vo-founder of Essar Group
 S. Somasegar, former senior vice president, Microsoft
 Srinivasaraghavan Venkataraghavan, former cricket captain and ICC Elite Umpires Panel member
 Upendra J. Chivukula, former New Jersey General Assembly member
 V. M. Muralidharan, chairman, Ethiraj College for Women 
 V. S. Mahalingam, DRDO scientist and director of the Centre for Artificial Intelligence and Robotics
 Venu Srinivasan, chairman of Sundaram - Clayton Limited and TVS Motor Company
 Verghese Kurien, architect of Operation Flood and Idnia's White Revolution and recipient of the Padma Vibhushan, Ramon Magsaysay Award and the World Food Prize
 M. Madan Babu , director at St. Jude Children's Research Hospital
 Sundaram Karivardhan, industrialist and motorsport pioneer
 A. G. Ramakrishnan, professor, Indian Institute of Science
 Mahesh Muthuswami, Cinematog 2012

See also 
 List of Colleges & Institutions affiliated to Anna University

References

External links

 Official website

 
Technical universities and colleges in India
Educational institutions established in 1978
1978 establishments in Tamil Nadu
Memorials to C. N. Annadurai